Vijayavani (Kannada: ವಿಜಯವಾಣಿ) is a Kannada-language newspaper distributed in the Indian state of Karnataka. It is published by VRL Group owned by logistics tycoon Vijay Sankeshwar.

Having launched on 1 April 2012, Vijayavani started with merely three editions. Today it has editions in several places like Bengaluru, Mangaluru, Hubballi, Mysuru, Belagavi, Vijayapura, Gangavathi, Chitradurga, Shivamogga and Kalaburgi.

Vijayavani the flagship entity of the VRL Group is the largest circulated newspaper in Karnataka. Vijayavani created media frenzy by being the only Kannada newspaper to launch nine editions in just 90 days from its 1st launch. Vijayavani is an all colour paper in all Karnataka. With growth rate of 262% in 3 years, Vijayavani today has a certified circulation of 8,03,738 copies. Vijayavani has an unmatched reach which covers 28 districts out of almost 30 districts in entire Karnataka. Apart from the regular content, a four-page

See also
 List of Kannada-language newspapers
 List of Kannada-language magazines
 List of newspapers in India
 Media in Karnataka
 Media of India

References

External links
 ‘Vijaya’ Means Competition for Kannada Newspapers
  Sankeshwar to 'disrupt' Kannada papers, again
 Sankeshwar to 'disrupt' Kannada papers, again
 Advertising on Vijayavani

Newspapers published in Bangalore
Kannada-language newspapers
VRL Group
Publications established in 2012
2012 establishments in Karnataka